Krung Thon Buri station (}) is a BTS Skytrain station, on the Silom Line in Khlong San District, Bangkok, Thailand. The station is on Krung Thon Buri Road. It was the first station of Bangkok's rapid transit system on the Chao Phraya River's west bank.

The station opened on 15 May 2009, together with Wongwian Yai station on the 2.2 km Skytrain extension.

Krung Thon Buri station connects to the Gold Line APM station of the same name.

Gallery

See also 
 Bangkok Skytrain

BTS Skytrain stations
Railway stations opened in 2009